Peter Hemmings OBE (10 April 19344 January 2002) was an English opera administrator, impresario and singer.

As a singer, he was an accomplished chorister in his youth and had a fine bass voice. He was educated at Mill Hill School and began his administrative career as president of the Cambridge University Opera Group. That company's success led to the founding of the New Opera Company in 1957 with Hemmings as general manager. In 1966, he became the chief administrator of Scottish Opera, a position he held for almost 20 years. In 1977, he was appointed general manager of the Australian Opera, but clashed with the music director, Richard Bonynge. In that difficult time his most significant contribution to opera in Australia was the commissioning of the opera Voss from Richard Meale. Later, he managed the London Symphony Orchestra for four years, then accepted a position as the general director of the Los Angeles Opera in 1984. He remained the company's general director until he returned to the UK in 2000 to take up a position on the board of the Royal Opera. He was survived by his wife Jane née Hemmings, two daughters, two sons and one stepdaughter.

References

Opera managers
Officers of the Order of the British Empire
People educated at Mill Hill School
1934 births
2002 deaths